The Outsiders is an American drama series that aired from March to July 1990 on Fox. Based on the characters from the 1967 novel of the same title by S. E. Hinton, the series' executive producer was the 1983 film's director Francis Ford Coppola.

Production
The 90-minute pilot episode directed by Alan Shapiro and Sharron Miller served as a sequel to the film and began with a short scene from the original film of Dallas Winston (Matt Dillon) running from police and being shot.

Alan Shapiro wrote and directed the pilot, which was aired as a special preview on March 25, 1990 (seven years after the release of the film) at 9:30 p.m. while the rest of the series aired at 7:00 p.m. The pilot was Fox's highest rated drama in the network's history, drawing a 9.3/16 national Nielsen rating and 14.1 million viewers, and tied for 64th for the week. However, The Outsiders lost half the viewers from its Married... with Children lead-in.

Cast

 Jay R. Ferguson as Ponyboy Curtis
 Rodney Harvey as Sodapop Curtis
 Boyd Kestner as Darrel "Darry" Curtis
 Harold Pruett as Steve Randle
 David Arquette as Keith "Two-Bit" Matthews
 Robert Rusler as Tim Shepherd
 Kim Walker as Sherri "Cherry" Valance
 Heather McComb as Belinda "Scout" Jenkins
 Sean Kanan as Gregg Parker
 Scott Coffey as Randy Anderson
 Billy Bob Thornton as Buck Merrill
 Jennifer McComb as Marcia
 Leonardo DiCaprio as Boy fighting Scout

Episodes

References

External links
 

1990 American television series debuts
1990 American television series endings
1990s American drama television series
1990s American teen drama television series
English-language television shows
Fox Broadcasting Company original programming
Period television series
Live action television shows based on films
Television series about teenagers
Television series by 20th Century Fox Television
Television series set in the 1960s
Television series based on adaptations
Television shows set in Cleveland